The Bulgarian Etymological Dictionary is a multi-volume etymological dictionary of the Bulgarian language. It is published by the Institute for Bulgarian Language at the Bulgarian Academy of Sciences. The first seven published corpora are available on the Institution for Bulgarian Language website.

It is an ongoing project, with eight volumes published in the period 1971-2017 and the ninth volume currently in preparation. The first 
eight volumes cover the words from А to фя̀калка.

Lexical stock
The dictionary includes all of the Bulgarian words collected until the moment of compilation but excludes loanwords that are exclusively used by bilingual Bulgarian speakers, as well as overly specialized terminology.

Volumes

References 

Etymological dictionaries
Bulgarian language

External links
 Bulgarian Etymological Dictionary Contains the 7 scanned tomes of the dictionary.